The South Rockfish Valley Rural Historic District encompasses a large rural landscape in northern Nelson County, Virginia. This area has been farmed since the 18th century, and many of its early land use patterns persist to this day.

The district was listed on the National Register of Historic Places in 2016.  Properties within the district that were previously listed on the National Register include River Bluff, Elk Hill, Three Chimneys, and the Wintergreen Country Store.

See also
National Register of Historic Places listings in Nelson County, Virginia

References

Historic districts on the National Register of Historic Places in Virginia
National Register of Historic Places in Nelson County, Virginia
Geography of Nelson County, Virginia